Jānis Lagzdiņš (born 15 June 1952, Liepāja) is a Latvian politician. He is a Deputy of the Saeima and a member of the People's Party.

References

1952 births
Living people
Politicians from Liepāja
Popular Front of Latvia politicians
Latvian Way politicians
People's Party (Latvia) politicians
Deputies of the Supreme Council of the Republic of Latvia
Deputies of the 5th Saeima
Deputies of the 6th Saeima
Deputies of the 7th Saeima
Deputies of the 8th Saeima
Deputies of the 9th Saeima